Local elections were held in San Mateo, Rizal, on May 9, 2022, as part of the Philippine general election. Held concurrently with the national elections, the electorate voted to elect a mayor, a vice mayor, eight members of the municipality's municipal council, a board member to the Rizal Provincial Board, and a representative to the House of Representatives. Those elected assumed their respective posts on June 30, 2022, alongside other local and national officials. 92,805 of 110,276 registered voters voted in these elections. 

Omie Rivera and Jimmy Roxas were elected to the mayoralty and vice mayoralty respectively, ending the Diaz family's longstanding hold on the municipality's mayoralty. Despite their mayoral loss, 1SanMateo won an outright majority in the municipal council, winning six of the eight elective seats. The remaining two seats were won by members of Team I Love San Mateo.    

This election was the first to utilize the newly created Rizal's 3rd congressional district, which gave the municipality its own representation in the House of Representatives and the Rizal Provincial Board. Jose Arturo Garcia Jr. and John Patrick Bautista won their respective races to represent the district as a representative and as a board member respectively.

Background 

In the 2019 elections, Tina Diaz and her husband Jose Rafael Diaz were re-elected to the municipality's mayoralty and vice mayoralty respectively, with Tina defeating Independent Wilfredo Selga and Jose Rafael being unopposed in the vice mayoral race. The Diaz family has controlled the municipality's mayoralty for decades at that point.

On March 25, 2022, President Rodrigo Duterte signed Republic Act 11533 into law, thereby separating the municipalities of San Mateo and Rodriguez from the province's second district to create its third and fourth districts. The law took effect on April 12, 2022, though the second district remained intact until the election and subsequent inauguration of the representatives for the new districts. Juan Fidel Felipe Nograles remained as the second district's representative until the end of the 18th Congress; he was redistricted to the fourth district after the division.

On August 20, 2020, both Tina and Jose Rafael Diaz tested positive for COVID-19; Municipal Administrator Ricardo Gomez was designated as the alternate signatory to all official municipal transactions as Diaz recovers from the disease.

MMDA General Manager Jose Arturo Garcia resigned his post as general manager on October 4, 2021 in order to run for representative.

Coalitions 
As the mayor, vice mayor and the members of the municipal council are elected on the same ballot, mayoral candidates may present or endorse a slate of candidates. These slates usually run with their respective mayoral and vice mayoral candidates along with the other members of their slate. A group of candidates independent of any mayoral or vice mayoral candidate may also form a slate consisting of themselves.

Administration coalition

Primary opposition coalition

Other coalitions

Independents not in coalitions

Non-independents not in coalitions

Mayoral election 
The incumbent mayor was Tina Diaz, who was re-elected in 2019 with 82.67% of the vote. Diaz opted to run for representative in the newly created San Mateo-based Rizal's 3rd congressional district, rather than a third term as mayor. Her coalition, 1SanMateo nominated her husband, Vice Mayor Jose Rafael to run in her stead. Jose Rafael previously served as mayor from 2007 through 2016 

Team I Love San Mateo slated outgoing Board Member and former Vice Mayor Omie Rivera to challenge Diaz.

Candidates 

 Jose Rafael Diaz (PDP–Laban) – Incumbent Vice Mayor of San Mateo (2019–2022), former Mayor of San Mateo (2007–2016)
 Omie Rivera (Liberal) – Incumbent Board Member for the 2nd district (2016–2022), former Vice Mayor of San Mateo

Results 

Rivera defeated Diaz in a landslide, ending the family's decades-long hold on the municipality's mayoralty. Rivera's election as mayor was considered as an upset victory by some observers.

Per barangay

Vice mayoral election 
The incumbent vice mayor was Jose Rafael Diaz, who was re-elected without opposition in 2019. Diaz ran for a comeback to the municipality's mayoralty, after his wife, Tina, opted to run for Congress. His coalition nominated incumbent Councilor Jimmy Roxas to run in his place.

Team I Love San Mateo slated Ariel Diaz to challenge Roxas.

Candidates 
 Ariel Diaz (Aksyon)
 Jimmy Roxas (PDP-Laban) – Incumbent Member of the Municipal Council, Candidate for mayor in 2013

Results 

Roxas narrowly defeated Diaz, defending the vice mayoralty for PDP-Laban.

Per barangay

House of Representatives election 

On March 25, 2021, Rizal's 2nd congressional district—which then included San Mateo—was split into three districts, with the third solely encompassing San Mateo. The second district in its previous form was last represented by Juan Fidel Nograles, who was re-elected in 2019 with 69.01% of the votes within the municipality. Nograles, who hails from Rodriguez, was redistricted to the fourth district, leaving the third district with an open race as a result.

The field to fill the open seat included three candidates. Incumbent Mayor Tina Diaz was nominated by the PDP–Laban to run for the seat, with the support of the ruling 1SanMateo coalition. Meanwhile, Team I Love San Mateo nominated Former Metropolitan Manila Development Authority General Manager Jose Arturo Garcia to challenge Diaz for the seat. Maria Cristina Diaz ran under the Aksyon Demokratiko party.

Candidates 

 Tina Diaz (PDP–Laban) – Incumbent Mayor of San Mateo (2016–2022)
 Ma. Cristina Diaz (Aksyon)
 Jose Arturo Garcia (NPC) – Metropolitan Manila Development Authority General Manager (2018–2021)

Results 

Garcia defeated both Tina Diaz and Ma. Cristina Diaz to become the district's first representative in its history.

Per barangay

Provincial board election 

The second district in its previous form was represented in the Rizal Provincial Board by incumbents Rommel Ayuson, Omie Rivera, Rolando Rivera, and Dino Tanjuatco, who were all re-elected in 2019. Following the creation of the third district—which solely encompasses San Mateo—the municipality is represented by one board member elected by the district.

Among the four incumbents, Ayuson and Tanjuatco ran for public office in other districts; Omie Rivera ran for the Mayoralty of San Mateo; Rolando Rivera was term-limited, and died in office on March 24, 2022. Thus, the third district was left with an open race for its provincial board seat. 

The ruling 1SanMateo coalition nominated Hermenegildo Cequeña for the seat, while Team I Love San Mateo nominated John Patrick Bautista for the seat. A third candidate—Cirilo Oropesa Jr.—also ran for the seat.

Candidates 

 John Patrick Bautista (NPC) – Candidate for vice mayor in 2016
 Hermenegildo Cequeña (PDP–Laban)
 Cirilo Oropesa Jr. (Aksyon)

Results 

Bautista defeated both Cequeña and Oropesa to become the district's sole board member.

Per barangay

Municipal Council election 
The San Mateo Municipal Council is composed of eight councilors elected to serve three-year terms. The election for the council is done via multiple non-transferable vote in which a voter has eight votes to distribute to eight different candidates. The eight candidates with the most votes will be elected to the council.

1SanMateo maintained their control of the municipal council, winning six of the eight elective seats. Meanwhile, Team I Love San Mateo won two seats.

Results

Per candidate 

|-bgcolor=black
|colspan=5|

Per coalition

References

External links 

 Certified List of Candidates: for Rizal – San Mateo

2022 Philippine local elections
Elections in Rizal
May 2022 events in the Philippines
2022 elections in Calabarzon